The following is a list of the 101 communes of the Territoire de Belfort department of France.

The communes cooperate in the following intercommunalities (as of 2020):
Communauté d'agglomération Grand Belfort
Communauté de communes du Sud Territoire
Communauté de communes des Vosges du Sud

See also
 Lists of communes of France
 Administrative divisions of France

References

Territoire de Belfort